The 1922 Chicago Maroons football team represented the University of Chicago during the 1922 Big Ten Conference football season. In Amos Alonzo Stagg's 31st year as head coach, the Maroons finished with a 5–1–1 record.

Notable players on the 1922 Chicago team included guard Joe Pondelik, fullback John Webster Thomas, halfback Jimmy Pyott, tackle Frank Gowdy, and center Ralph King. Thomas was selected by Walter Camp and the New York Tribune as a first-team All-American in 1922. Fritz Crisler was an assistant coach on the team.

Schedule

See also
1922 Princeton vs. Chicago football game

References

Chicago
Chicago Maroons football seasons
Big Ten Conference football champion seasons
Chicago Maroons